This article list the results of women's doubles category in the 2009 All England Super Series of badminton.

Seeds
 Cheng Wen-Hsing and Chien Yu-chin
 Chin Eei Hui and Wong Pei Tty
 Lee Hyo-jung and Lee Kyung-won
 Du Jing and Yu Yang
 Ha Jung-eun and Kim Min-jung
 Lena Frier Kristiansen and Kamilla Rytter Juhl
 Zhang Yawen and Zhao Tingting
 Shendy Puspa Irawati and Meiliana Jauhari

Draws

Finals

Top Half

Bottom Half

Sources
Yonex All England Open Super Series 2009 - Women's doubles

- Women's Doubles, 2009 All England Super Series